The Antipodes Islands are inhospitable and uninhabited volcanic islands in subantarctic waters to the south of – and territorially part of – New Zealand. The 21 km2 archipelago lies 860 km to the southeast of Stewart Island/Rakiura, and 730 km to the northeast of Campbell Island. They are very close to being the antipodal point to Normandy in France, meaning that the city farthest away is Cherbourg-en-Cotentin, France.

The island group consists of one main island, Antipodes Island, of 20 km2 area, Bollons Island to the north, and numerous small islets and stacks.

The islands are listed with the New Zealand Outlying Islands. The islands are an immediate part of New Zealand, but not part of any region or district, but instead Area Outside Territorial Authority, like all the other outlying islands except the Solander Islands.

Ecologically, the islands are part of the Antipodes Subantarctic Islands tundra ecoregion. The islands are inscribed on the UNESCO World Heritage List, together with other subantarctic New Zealand islands. The island group is a nature reserve and there is no general public access.

Etymology

The island group was originally called the Penantipodes meaning 'next to the antipodes', because it lies near to the antipodes of London (located around 51.5°S, 180°W). Over time the name has been shortened to Antipodes. The island's actual antipodes are situated on the territory of the French village , near Cherbourg-en-Cotentin.

Geography

They consist of a main island (Antipodes Island), area , surrounded by a series of small offshore islands and rocks. Numerous small islets and stacks further surround the coast of the main island.

The islands are steep, and cliffs and rocky reefs line the majority of the coasts. Several other heights on the main island reach above , as does the highest point of Bollons Island. A ridge of peaks, the Reliance Ridge, runs along the main island's south coast. Several small streams run from the slopes of the main island's peaks, with the largest of these being the Dougall Stream, which runs northeast from the eastern slopes of Mount Waterhouse to reach the east coast not far from its closest point to Leeward Island. The Ringdove Stream runs east along the northern flanks of the Reliance Ridge to reach the large, rocky Ringdove Bay in the southeast of the main island. A further prominent stream runs southwest from the northwestern slopes of Mount Waterhouse to reach Stack Bay to the south of the Cave Point Peninsula, and a fourth runs north from the slopes of Mount Galloway, reaching the sea to the west of North Cape, close to Reef Point.

History

Prehistory
There is no archaeological evidence of human visitation prior to European discovery of the islands. The Museum has not been able to locate such a shard in its collection, and the original reference to the object in the Museum's collection documentation indicates no reference to Polynesian influences.

Sealing
The island group was seen on March 25, 1800, by Captain Henry Waterhouse commanding HMS Reliance. Matthew Flinders was first lieutenant, and his younger brother Samuel, was a midshipman on the vessel: Samuel prepared the chart of the islands. Waterhouse reported the presence of seals. In 1803 Waterhouse's brother-in-law George Bass applied to Governor Philip Gidley King of New South Wales for a fishing monopoly from a line bisecting southern New Zealand from Dusky Sound to the Otago Harbour to cover all the lands and seas to the south, including the Antipodes Islands, probably because he knew the latter were home to large populations of fur seals. Bass sailed from Sydney to the south that year and was never heard of again but his information led to a sealing boom at the islands in 1805 to 1807. In February 1805, the first sealing gangs arrived on the island from the American schooners Favorite and Independence. They killed about 60,000 seals over the course of the year they were stationed on the islands.

At one time eighty men were present; there was a battle between American and British-led gangs and a single cargo of more than 80,000 skins—one of the greatest ever shipped from Australasia—was on-sold in Canton for one pound sterling a skin, a multimillion-dollar return in modern terms. Prominent Sydney merchants such as Simeon Lord, Henry Kable and James Underwood were engaged in the trade as well as the Americans Daniel Whitney and Owen Folger Smith. William W. Stewart, who claimed to have charted Stewart Island, and probably William Tucker who started the retail trade in preserved Maori heads, were present during the boom. After 1807, sealing was occasional and cargoes small, no doubt because the animals had been all but exterminated.

Shipwrecks

A much later attempt to establish cattle on the islands was short-lived (as were the cattle). When the ship  (with a crew of 16) foundered off the main island's coast in 1893, the eleven surviving crew spent nearly three months living as castaways on the island, living on raw muttonbirds, mussels and roots for 87 days before gaining the attention of the government steamer  by a flag made from their sail.

A well-supplied castaway depot was available on the other end of the island, but the survivors' weak condition and the island's mountainous terrain prevented them from searching for depots.

The last wreck at the Antipodes was the yacht Totorore with the loss of two lives, Gerry Clark and Roger Sale, in June 1999.

Nuclear testing proposals
In 1955 the British Government required a large site remote from population centres to test the new thermonuclear devices it was developing. Various islands in the South Pacific and Southern Oceans were considered, along with Antarctica. The Admiralty suggested the Antipodes Islands.

Flora and fauna

The flora of the islands has been recorded in detail, and includes megaherbs. The islands are also home to numerous bird species including the endemic Antipodes snipe, Antipodes parakeet, Reischek's parakeet, as well as several albatrosses, petrels and penguins, including half of the world population of the erect-crested penguin.

The original population of fur seals seems to be regionally extinct or in serious peril where "Upland Seals" once found on Antipodes and Macquarie Island have been claimed as a distinct subspecies with thicker furs by scientists although it is unclear whether these seals were genetically distinct.

Important Bird Area
The Antipodes group has been identified as an Important Bird Area (IBA) by BirdLife International because of its significance as a breeding site for several species of seabirds. The seabirds are southern rockhopper and erect-crested penguins, Antipodean, black-browed, light-mantled and white-capped albatrosses, and northern giant, grey and white-chinned petrels.

Conservation
As with many other islands, introduced rodents have caused problems by preying on the indigenous wildlife. A "Million Dollar Mouse" campaign was launched in 2012 to raise funds for an eradication programme as part of the New Zealand government's "Predator Free 2050" project. In the winter of 2016, the Department of Conservation carried out bait drops totalling 65 tonnes from three helicopters, and searched with trained dogs for any remaining rodents, which eliminated the estimated 200,000 mice on Antipodes Island.

The island group is surrounded by the  Moutere Mahue / Antipodes Island Marine Reserve.

See also

Composite Antarctic Gazetteer
Territorial claims in Antarctica
New Zealand Subantarctic Islands
List of Antarctic and subantarctic islands
List of islands of New Zealand
List of islands
Desert island

References

Further reading
Wise's New Zealand Guide (4th ed.; 1969). Dunedin: H. Wise & Co. (N.Z.) Ltd.
"NGA-IWI-O-AOTEA". No. 59 (June 1967). Te Ao Hou – The Maori Magazine, pp. 43.
Godley, E.J. The Botany of Antipodes Island. New Zealand Journal of Botany, 1989, Vol. 27: 531-563
Entwisle, Peter (2005). Taka, A Vignette Life of William Tucker 1784–1817. Dunedin: Port Daniel Press. .
Taylor, Rowley, (2006) Straight Through from London, the Antipodes and Bounty Islands, New Zealand. Christchurch: Heritage Expeditions New Zealand Ltd. .
Marris, J.W.M. (2000): The beetle (Coleoptera) fauna of the Antipodes Islands, with comments on the impact of mice; and an annotated checklist of the insect and arachnid fauna. Journal of the Royal Society of New Zealand, 30: 169–195.   PDF
Warham, J.; Johns, P.M. 1975: The University of Canterbury Antipodes Island Expedition 1969. Journal of the Royal Society of New Zealand, 5(2): 103–131.  Google books

External links
Antipodes Islands at the Department of Conservation
Island Conservation: Antipodes Islands Project

Antipodes Islands
Archipelagoes of New Zealand
Archipelagoes of the Southern Ocean
Former populated places in New Zealand
Important Bird Areas of the Antipodes Islands
Nature reserves in New Zealand
New Zealand subantarctic islands
Subantarctic islands
Volcanic islands of New Zealand
Volcanoes of the New Zealand outlying islands
Island restoration
Pleistocene shield volcanoes